Trichophyma is a genus of fungi in the order Arthoniales. The genus has not been placed into a family.

References

Arthoniomycetes
Taxa described in 1905
Lichenicolous fungi
Taxa named by Heinrich Rehm